Spork is a 2011 American independent coming-of-age musical comedy-drama film produced by Christopher Racster, Chad Allen, Honey Labrador and Geric Miller-Frost, written and directed by J.B. Ghuman Jr. and starring Savannah Stehlin, Sydney Park, Rachel G. Fox, Michael William Arnold, Oana Gregory, Rodney Eastman, Beth Grant, Yeardley Smith of The Simpsons fame, Keith David, Elaine Hendrix and Richard Riehle. Also produced by Neca Films, Last Bastion Entertainment, 11:11 Entertainment Inc., Bent Film and Archer Productions, the film was theatrically released in the United States of America on May 20, 2011 by Underhill Entertainment and Wrekin Hill Entertainment. Spork received mixed reviews from film critics and also received a score of 50% from Rotten Tomatoes.

Plot
Set in Los Angeles, California, a 14-year-old teenage girl nicknamed "Spork" is unpopular, mistreated by her classmates, and very soft-spoken. Her next-door neighbor and best friend, known as "Tootsie Roll", is planning on entering the school Dance-Off to win $236 which she would use to visit her father in prison. During a hair-product-related dancing accident, Tootsie Roll injures her ankle and can no longer compete in the competition. Spork rises to the occasion and surprises the whole school by signing up for the Dance-Off.

Spork and Tootsie Roll listen to hip-hop songs from the early 1990s and wear 1990s fashion, yet the antagonist, Betsy Byotch, and her friends wear 1980s garb and listen to 1980s music (though they are also fans of Britney Spears). The character of Charlie is obsessed with Justin Timberlake, whose career began in the mid–1990s. The use of the term "hermaphrodite" rather than "intersex" as a qualifier, including as a personal identity, also seems to imply a 1990s setting.

It is mentioned throughout the film that Spork and Charlie are obsessed with The Wizard of Oz, though Spork's love is for the 1978 film The Wiz, and Charlie's is for the 1939 The Wizard of Oz.

Cast
 Savannah Stehlin as Spork
 Sydney Park as Tootsie Roll
 Rachel G. Fox as Betsy Byotch
 Michael William Arnold as Charlie
 Oana Gregory as Loosie Goosie
 Beth Grant as Principal Tulip
 Elaine Hendrix as Felicia
 Yeardley Smith as Ms. Danahy
 Rodney Eastman as Spit
 Keith David as Coach Jenkins
 Richard Riehle as Clyde

Critical reception
Spork received mixed reviews from film critics. It received a score of 50% from Rotten Tomatoes.

References

External links
 
 
 Yahoo! Movies

2011 films
2011 comedy films
American comedy films
2011 LGBT-related films
2010s English-language films
Films about intersex
2010s American films